Xinhuang railway station is a railway station in Xinhuang Dong Autonomous County, Huaihua, Hunan, China. It is an intermediate stop on the Hunan–Guizhou section of the Shanghai–Kunming railway. It opened in 1972 and is under China Railway Guangzhou Group.

References 

Railway stations in Hunan
Railway stations in China opened in 1972